Janny Sikazwe (born 1979) is a former Zambian international football referee.
He got his big break in 2008 at COSAFA U-20 Challenge Cup in South Africa when he was called to replace another referee who had failed a fitness test.

On 7 January 2023 he officiated his last career match between Napsa Stars and Red Arrows.

He was one of the referees for the 2015 Africa Cup of Nations. He refereed the 2016 FIFA Club World Cup Final When in Japan, and the 2017 Africa Cup of Nations Final in Gabon. He was selected to officiate at the 2018 FIFA World Cup in Russia, and made his debut in the Belgium vs Panama Group G game on 18 June. The match also saw him going into the record books as he became the first Zambian referee to officiate a game at the FIFA World Cup finals.

Sikazwe also refereed at the 2021 Africa Cup of Nations, where he came under scrutiny for incorrectly calling for full-time twice in the Group F game between Mali and Tunisia on 12 January 2022: firstly at the 86th minute, and again before the 91st minute by about 17 seconds. He announced the return of the match after 25 minutes of stopping to complete three minutes, but the Tunisian team refused to complete it. A forensic report stated that Sikazwe suffered heat stroke, which contributed to his mishandling of the match.

References

External links
Janny Sikazwe at WorldReferee.com

Living people
1979 births
Zambian football referees
People from Kapiri Mposhi District
2018 FIFA World Cup referees
2022 FIFA World Cup referees
FIFA World Cup referees